William Pulido (born 23 February 1965) is a Colombian former racing cyclist. He rode in the 1990 Tour de France.

References

External links

1965 births
Living people
Colombian male cyclists
People from Villavicencio
20th-century Colombian people